Joseph Meng Ziwen (March 19, 1903 - January 7, 2007) was a Chinese Catholic bishop. He spent twenty five years in a labor camp. His position as bishop was limited to the "underground church" as it was not officially recognized because it came from the Holy See. That stated the government did recognize him as a priest of the Chinese Patriotic Catholic Association, which was useful in allowing him to aid Catholic interests.

References

1903 births
2007 deaths
20th-century Roman Catholic bishops in China
Chinese centenarians
Men centenarians